The Tamai bent-toed gecko (Cyrtodactylus tamaiensis) is a species of lizard in the family Gekkonidae. The species is endemic to Myanmar.

Geographic range
C. tamaiensis is known only from the Nam Tamai Valley in northern Myanmar.

Description
It has a dorsal color pattern of dense pale and dark brown marbling.

References

Further reading
Mahony, Stephen (2009). "Taxonomic status of Cyrtodactylus khasiensis tamaiensis (Smith, 1940) and description of a new species allied to C. chrysopylos Bauer, 2003 from Myanmar (Reptilia: Gekkonidae)". Hamadryad 34 (1): 62–74. (Cyrtodactylus tamaiensis, new status).
Smith MA (1940). "The Amphibians and Reptiles obtained by Mr. Ronald Kaulback in Upper Burma". Records of the Indian Museum 42: 465–486. (Gymnodactylus khasiensis tamaiensis, new subspecies, p. 475).

Cyrtodactylus
Reptiles described in 1940